Tropical Airplay is a chart that ranks the top-performing songs (regardless of genre or language) on tropical radio stations in the United States, published by Billboard magazine based on weekly airplay data compiled by Nielsen's Broadcast Data Systems. It is a subchart of Hot Latin Songs, which lists the best-performing Spanish-language songs in the country. In 1996, 20 songs topped the chart, in 52 issues of the magazine.

The first number one of the year was "Nadie Como Ella" by Marc Anthony, which had been in the top spot since the issue dated December 23, 1995, and spent a total of three weeks at this position. Marc Anthony was also the artist with most number ones in 1996 with five songs. Víctor Manuelle and Jerry Rivera achieved their first chart-toppers in 1996 and each had two number ones in the year. "Loco de Amor" by Rivera held this position for seven weeks and tied with Frankie Ruiz's song "Ironía" for the longest run at number one. The latter song was named the best-performing track of the year on the Tropical Airplay chart and won the Billboard Latin Music Award for "Tropical/Salsa Hot Latin Track of the Year" in 1997.

Dark Latin Groove, a salsa and hip hop fusion concept by American musician Sergio George, released their self-titled album in 1996. The album's first two singles, "No Morirá" and "Todo Mi Corazón", both reached number one on the Tropical Airplay chart. Gilberto Santa Rosa topped the chart for the first time in 1996 with "No Quiero Na' Regala'o", which was also the final number one of the year. Jessica Cristina (credited as Jessica), Domingo Quiñones, and Tony Vega obtained their first and only chart-toppers in the year. Cristina was the only female artist to have a number one on the Tropical Airplay chart in 1996.

Chart history

See also
1996 in Latin music

References

1996
United States Latin Tropical Airplay
1996 in Latin music